Green Haywood Hackworth (Prestonsburg, Kentucky, January 23, 1883 – Washington, DC, June 24, 1973) was an American jurist who served as the first U.S. judge on the International Court of Justice, as President of the International Court of Justice, as the longest running Legal Adviser to the US Department of State (1925 -1946) and as a member of Secretary of State Cordell Hull's inner circle of advisers.  Hackworth was instrumental in the development of plans for the post World War II world order and was a key member of the U.S. delegation to the Dumbarton Oaks Conference (1944). He served as a member of the Advisory Committee on Postwar Foreign Policy (1942), as a member of Post War Programs Committee (1944) and as Chairman of the Committee of Jurists that drafted the initial statutes for the International Court of Justice (1945). Hackworth also represented the U.S. Delegation on Committee IV at the United Nations Conference on International Organization where the articles in the United Nations Charter pertaining to the International Court of Justice were finalized.

Early life and education

Green Haywood Hackworth was born in Prestonburg  Kentucky and his youth was spent in the area of the Big Sandy River.  He received a B.A. degree from Valparaiso University, a Doctor of Law degree from the University of Kentucky and an L.L.B degree from George Washington University. In 1916, after completion of his legal studies, Hackworth secured a job as a law clerk with the U.S. Department of State and in 1918 was promoted to Assistant Solicitor within the department.  Although a Democrat, Hackworth was chosen in 1925 by republican U.S. Secretary of State Charles Evans Hughes, for nomination by the President and subsequent approval by the Senate to become Solicitor of the Dept. of State.

Legal Adviser to the U.S. Department of State

As the longest running Legal Adviser of the Department of State, Hackworth was relied upon for legal advice by five successive U.S. Secretaries of States: Charles Evans Hughes, Frank B. Kellogg, Henry L. Stimson, Cordell Hull and Edward Stettinius Jr. Hackworth was noted for being a skilled legal draftsman concerning the area of treaty provisions and was a perforce in matters involving the U.S. and its foreign relations from the period of U.S. neutrality to the country's entry into World War II. He provided advice to the U.S. President, the U.S. Secretary of State, members of congress and other departments within the U.S. State Department. As Legal Adviser to the Department of State, Hackworth represented the U.S Government before the International Joint Commission formed by the United States and Canada under the Boundary Waters treaty of 1909. He was a U.S. delegate in 1930 to the First Conference for the Codification of International Law, held at the Hague under the auspices of the League of Nations.  Hackworth participated in the 8th Conference of American States (1939) held in Lima, in the 8th Scientific Congress of American States (1940) and in the Inter - American Maritime Conference (1941).  Following the outbreak of war in Europe,   Hackworth served as Adviser to Secretary of State Hull at the 2nd Meeting of foreign Ministers of the American Republics (1941) held in Havana.

World War Two

On Sunday Dec. 7 Hackworth was in conclave with Secretary of State Hull at the state department prior to the scheduled meeting with Japanese ambassadors Kichisaburo Nomura and Saburo Kurusu when President Roosevelt called at 1:30PM and informed Hull of the attack by Japan on Pearl Harbor. Hull consulted with Hackworth and Josheph Ballentine, a state department expert on the Far East, on whether or not to see the waiting Japanese diplomats. After seeing and then dismissing the diplomats, Hull met with President Roosevelt and then later again with Hackworth where the two discussed drafting a proclamation of war between Japan and the United States.  As the war progressed, Hackworth advised Secretary Hull, President Roosevelt, Judge Samuel Rosenman, and numerous agencies within the government.  His role was to consider past legal developments in the laws of war, the laws of neutrality, laws of belligerency and the effect of these laws on the U.S. and other countries.  In 1943, Hackworth served as an adviser to Secretary of State Hull at the Moscow Conference and in 1945 he served as Adviser to Secretary of State Edward Stettinius at the Conference of American States on Problems of War and Peace held in Mexico City.

Post War Planning

In Feb. of 1942, Secretary of State Cordell Hull organized the Advisory Committee on Postwar Foreign Policy which was followed by the Special Subcommittee on International Organization of which Hackworth was an integral part.  The subcommittee prepared draft proposals that clarified the U.S. State Dept.'s vague views on a postwar organization.  In over 40 meetings in 1943, the Special Subcommittee on International Organization made intensive studies of key issues upon which any plans for a future world organization would have to depend. In March 1943, Hull formed the Political Agenda Group which was composed of Hackworth, Edward R. Stettinius and other members of Hull's inner circle.  This organization championed a global organization as opposed to Undersecretary of State Sumner Welles' vision of a regional post war system.  In December 1943, this group prepared and delivered to President Roosevelt a detailed post war plan that became the founding framework of the United Nations. After President Roosevelt approved outline of the plan, Hull created The Policy Committee and the Post War Programs Committee, composed of Hackworth and other close advisers from the previously established Informal Agenda Group, to implement the vision of a United Nations.

Dumbarton Oaks Conference

Prior to the Dumbarton Oaks conference,  the U.S. State Dept. originated the American Planning Group for preparation. This group was divided into three sections and each section was responsible for a different topic that was to be addressed at Dumbarton Oaks.

Hackworth headed the second group charged with studying arrangements for the peaceful settlements of international disputes and the development of a World Court.  At the Dumbarton Oaks Conference, Hackworth chaired a special Legal Subcommittee that was established to deal with the issue of a World Court.  The subcommittee used as a base the American draft statute that Hackworth's section had developed prior to the conference.
 The subcommittee first dealt with the technically complex issue of whether or not the present court should be continued or a new court established and also what the relationship should be of the new court with the new international organization.  Hackworth championed the American's view that retaining as much of the existing court statutes as possible. However, the Soviets strongly opposed the continuing membership of certain neutral states in the World Court and favored a new tribunal.  This dispute and others over the World Court were settled at the general U.N. Conference at San Francisco where Hackworth represented the U.S. on Committee IV, which was tasked with finalizing statutes for the International Court of Justice.

International Court of Justice

Hackworth was nominated by three former U.S. Secretaries of State for an initial six-year term on the Court and was subsequently elected to a full nine-year term in 1951. In 1955 he succeeded Sir Arnold McNair of Great Britain for a three-year term as President of the International Court of Justice.  During his tenure on the Court, Hackworth adjudicated seventeen contentious cases and was asked to give eleven advisory opinions.  Due to Hackworth's experience as a legal draftsman, the task of consolidating views of Court members was frequently assigned to him.

Reparation for Injuries Suffered in the Service of the United Nations

In the case  Reparation for Injuries Suffered in the Service of the United Nations, Hackworth disagreed with the Court in its interpretation of the implied powers doctrine and in his dissent maintained that, "powers not expressed cannot freely be implied.  Implied powers flow from a grant of express powers, and are limited by those that are "necessary" to the exercise of powers expressly granted."  He disagreed with the majority in that he felt that the majority used an unduly wide version of the implied powers doctrine by relating the power to be implied not to an express provision but rather to the functions and objectives of the organization concerned.

International Court of Justice rulings

Positions

1916 - Law Clerk, U.S. Department of State
1918 - Assistant Solicitor, U.S. Department of State
1925 - Solicitor of the Dept. of State, U.S. Department of State,
1931 - Legal Adviser of the Dept. of State, U.S. Department of State 
1930 - Member of U.S. Delegation, Conference on the Codification of International Law 
1939 - Adviser to U.S. Secretary of State, Meeting of Foreign Ministers of the American Republics 
1940 - Member of U.S. Delegation, Conference of American States 
1943 - Member of U.S. Delegation, Moscow Conference 
1944 - Member of U.S. Delegation, Dumbarton Oaks Conference 
1945 - Chairman, Committee of Jurists for Drafting Statutes of the International Court of Justice 
1945 - Adviser to US. Delegation, San Francisco Conference on International Organization of the United Nations  
1946 - U.S. Judge, International Court of Justice

Associations
Council on Foreign Relations
District of Columbia Bar
U.S. Supreme Court Bar
Permanent Court of Arbitration
American Society of International Law

Publications
"Digest of International Law" 1940-1944 (eight volumes)

See also
Marjorie M. Whiteman

References

Further reading
Cox, Graham 2019 Seeking Justice for the Holocaust: Herbert C. Pell, Franklin D. Roosevelt, and the Limits of International Law University of Oklahoma Press. 
Pomerance, Michla 1996  The United States and the World Court As a 'Supreme Court of the Nations''' Martinus Nijhoff Publishers.
Simpson, Christopher 1995  The Splendid Blond Beast: Money, Law, and Genocide in the Twentieth Century'', Common Courage Press .

American legal writers
International law scholars
1883 births
1973 deaths
Valparaiso University alumni
Presidents of the International Court of Justice
American judges of United Nations courts and tribunals
20th-century American judges